Tafunga Bonjisi (born 1982) is a Zimbabwean sculptor.

Born a twin in Ruwa, Bonjisi is the brother of sculptors Witness and Lameck Bonjisi; he attended primary school in Ruwa and high school in Tafara.  He studied sculpture with Lameck before beginning a solo career in 2000.  He has worked in cobalt and springstone, among other media.

References
Biographical sketch

1982 births
Living people
Zimbabwean sculptors
Zimbabwean twins
People from Mashonaland East Province
21st-century sculptors